Ek Alag Mausam, (Hindi: एक अलग मौसम) is a 2003 Hindi movie directed by K. P. Sasi with Nandita Das, Anupam Kher and Rajit Kapur in the lead roles. Renuka Shahane, Arundathi Nag, Sreelatha and Sally Dynevor are in the supporting roles. Veteran Malayalam character actor Gopi is in a guest role as George's father.

Plot
Aparna Verma (Nandita Das), who has been married to a traveling salesman Suresh for several years, is now pregnant. After she completes some medical tests, she is asked to come see the doctor along with her husband. Suresh refuses to go, Aparna goes alone and this is where she receives the news that she has AIDS and she must abort the child. Aparna subsequently learns that Suresh has been having unprotected sex with other women, had acquired AIDS and passed it on to her. She confers with her mother, finds out about a rehabilitation house called "Jivan Jyoti" and goes there to volunteer without telling anyone about her condition. She meets with Dr. Machado (Anupam Kher), who informs her that he is aware of her condition but promises not to tell anyone else. Now divorced, Aparna feels herself getting attracted to another worker, George (Rajit Kapur), who is a truck driver and also works in Jivan Jyoti. George is very friendly with the children of Jivan Jyoti. But the knowledge of her being HIV positive restrains her from getting too friendly with him. She learns that he too is HIV positive. She avoids him and mixes with the children. A prostitute Rita (Renuka Shahane) and her young daughter Paro are brought to Jivan Jyoti. Rita passes away leaving Paro in the care of Aparna. George leaves Jivan Jyoti feeling shunned by Aparna but only after disposing his truck and garage and donating the proceeds for the development of Jivan Jyoti. Aparna takes Paro to a boarding school for admission where she meets George after a long time. They unite with the help of Dr Machado.

Cast
 Nandita Das – Aparna Suresh Verma 
 Rajit Kapoor – George 
 Anupam Kher – Dr. Machado 
 Renuka Shahane – Rita 
 Sally Dynevor – Social worker
 Arundathi Nag – Aparna's mother
 Ajit Hande
 Yash Joshi
 Harish Raju
 Anuradha Rao
 Tanaya Joshi
 Babu Annur
 Gargi Vegiraju
 Ramakrishna
 Nanda Kumar
 Sreelatha
Anant Kumar
Bharat Gopy – George's father
Kishori Ballal
 Arjun R.
 Manshad C. V.
Rakesh Sharma
 Nihal Rao
 Baburaj P.
 Satheesh Poduval
 Munira Sen
 Lakshmi
 Varsha

Music
The music was scored by Ravi and the songs were written by  Kaifi Azmi and Sushma Ahuja.
"Har Taraf" - Anuradha Paudwal
"Safe Sex" - Nalin Dave, Mohini Singh
"Tara Rum Pum" - Anupam Kher, Usha Krishnadas
"Thoda Pyar Thodi Hansi" - Nalin Dave
"Uski Baari Jo Thi" - Hariharan
"Usko Paane Se Pehle" (Female) - Anuradha Paudwal
"Usko Paane Se Pehle" (Male) - Hariharan

References

External links
 

2003 films
2000s Hindi-language films
Films scored by Ravi